The 1987 Grambling State Tigers football team represented Grambling State University as a member of the Southwestern Athletic Conference (SWAC) during the 1987 NCAA Division I-AA football season. The Tigers were led by head coach Eddie Robinson in his 45th year and finished the season with a record of five wins and six losses (5–6, 3–4 SWAC). The Tigers offense scored 278 points while the defense allowed 208 points. The game was the final football game played at "Old" Yankee Stadium. The Tigers failed to get their first winning season since 1959.

Schedule

Team players in the NFL

References

Grambling State
Grambling State Tigers football seasons
Grambling State Tigers football